On 4 November 2020, a blast at a chemical factory in Ahmedabad, Gujarat, India caused deaths of 12 people and injuries to nine others.

Incident
A blast occurred at Sahil Enterprise, a chemical factory on Piplaj road in Pirana, Ahmedabad at 11:22 am IST. Kanika Texo Fab, a textile facility next to the factory, had around 30 people working when the blast occurred. The building collapsed and several people died and others injured due to the fallen debris. A total 12 people, including five women, died. Nine others, including four women, were admitted to the L G Hospital, six of whom were in critical condition.

Rescue and compensation
The fire brigade arrived with 60 firefighters and 24 fire engines. The rescue operation lasted till 8:00 pm IST.

The Government of Gujarat had announced an ex gratia of  each to the families of those killed.

Investigation
The Chief Minister of Gujarat Vijay Rupani had ordered the investigation. An inquiry commission comprising two members was formed for investigation. The FIR was filed by Gujarat Police against the owner of the chemical factory and two owners of the estate on 5 November 2020.

See also
2020 Dahej chemical plant explosion
Visakhapatnam gas leak
List of industrial disasters

References

2020 disasters in India
2020 industrial disasters
2020s in Gujarat
Chemical plant explosions
Disasters in Gujarat
Explosions in 2020
Explosions in India
2020 chemical factory blast
November 2020 events in India
Events in Ahmedabad